Eliseo Víctor Mouriño Oyarbide (3 June 1927 – 3 April 1961) was an Argentine footballer. He began his career at Club Atlético Banfield before moving to join Boca Juniors with whom he won an Argentine league title in 1954. He played as a holding midfielder for the early part of his career before converting to centre-back and was part of the Argentina squad at the 1958 FIFA World Cup. He died in a plane crash in 1961.

Achievements

Club
Boca Juniors
Primera División: 1954

International
Argentina
Copa América: 1955, 1959

References

External links

Career Stats
Boca Juniors Stats 

1927 births
1961 deaths
Argentine footballers
Argentine expatriate footballers
Argentine expatriate sportspeople in Chile
Argentina international footballers
Club Atlético Banfield footballers
Boca Juniors footballers
Club de Deportes Green Cross footballers
Expatriate footballers in Chile
Chilean Primera División players
Argentine Primera División players
1958 FIFA World Cup players
Burials at San José de Flores Cemetery
Victims of aviation accidents or incidents in Chile
Association football midfielders
Footballers from Buenos Aires